Eshkol-Wachman movement notation is a notation system for recording movement on paper or computer screen. The system was created in Israel by dance theorist Noa Eshkol and Avraham Wachman, a professor of architecture at the Technion. The system is used in many fields, including dance, physical therapy, animal behavior and early diagnosis of autism.

The Movement Notation Society, located in Holon, Israel, is the official organization devoted to Eshkol-Wachman movement notation.

Overview 
Eshkol-Wachman movement notation is a system to record movement on paper or computer screen, developed by choreographer Noa Eshkol (daughter of Levi Eshkol) and architect Abraham Wachman. It was originally developed for dance to enable choreographers to write a dance down on paper that dancers could later reconstruct in its entirety, much as composers write a musical score that musicians can later play.

In comparison to most dance notation systems, Eshkol-Wachman movement notation was intended to notate any manner of movement, not only dance. As such, it is not limited to particular dance styles or even to the human form. It has been used to analyze animal behaviour as well as dance (Golani 1976).

Eshkol-Wachman movement notation treats the body as a sort of stick figure. The body is divided at its skeletal joints, and each pair of joints defines a line segment (a "limb"). For example, the foot is a limb bounded by the ankle and the end of the toe.

The relationship of those segments in three-dimensional space is described using a spherical coordinate system. If one end of a line segment is held in a fixed position, that point is the center of a sphere whose radius is the length of the line segment. Positions of the free end of the segment can be defined by two coordinate values on the surface of that sphere, analogous to latitude and longitude on a globe.

Limb positions are written somewhat like fractions, with the vertical number written over the horizontal number. The horizontal component (the lower) is read first. These two numbers are enclosed in brackets or parentheses to indicate whether the position in being described relative to an adjacent limb or to external reference points, such as a stage.

Eshkol-Wachman scores are written on grids, where each horizontal row represents the position and movement of a single limb, and each vertical column represents a unit of time. Movements are shown as transitions between initial and end coordinates.

History 
Noa Eshkol (1924–2007) and Abraham Wachman (1931–2010) created the Eshkol-Wachman Movement Notation (EWMN) for recording movement.  The original book presenting the system was published by Weidenfeld & Nicolson in 1958.  EWMN is a movement notation, not a dance notation.  Its user therefore can write down any form of human or animal movement without limiting oneself to any particular style (classical ballet for example).  It gives the notator the freedom to use this system wherever movement occurs.

EWMN offers a new and original way of thinking about, observing and analyzing movement.  Eshkol was a revolutionary thinker herself and she believed that movement notation could open a lot of new doors in fields where movement is involved.  Using EWMN, she composed five dance suites (Publication) all of them to be performed without music.  (When performed without music, the audience and the dancers are forced to focus on how movement by itself can evoke emotions within and set the mood of a choreographed dance.)  When asked to address her viewpoint, Eshkol used the example that someone does not swell their chest to express strength but instead the action of swelling the chest causes the feeling of strength.  (This is somewhat parallel to the James-Lange theory of emotion.)  Eshkol stated that by analyzing movement we might begin to understand how one movement evokes a certain emotion while another movement produces an entirely different feeling.  The use of movement notation can also lead to the discovery of new laws of composition in particular dance styles, similar to those found in music or other types of art where aesthetic rules are implemented.

Structure: basic elements 
The following are the basic concepts of EWMN;

The body 

To establish one general form that will stand conceptually for all bodies, an abstract body, similar to a 'stick figure' image is proposed: a 'man without qualities'.  Each limb is reduced to its longitudinal axis – an imaginary straight line of unchanging length.  A limb, in EW, is considered to be any part of the body, which lies between two adjacent joints or a joint and a free extremity.

Law of 'light' and 'heavy' limbs 

When a person walks his legs move but the rest of his body (i.e. the torso, the arm, and the head) is being carried along by the movement of the legs.  EWMN labels this phenomenon "the law of light and heavy limbs".  The structure of the body is dealt with as a branching linkage.  The base is conceived as the 'heaviest' segment of the body.  When a 'heavy' limb moves it carries all adjacent 'lighter' limbs passively along.

When standing upright the feet, considered as the base of the body, are the heaviest limb.  The legs are lighter (than the base), the torso lighter than the legs, etc.

Manuscript page 

EWMN is written, not drawn.  Movements are written on a horizontally ruled notation page (resembling a spreadsheet) which represents the body.  Vertical lines divide the page into columns, denoting units of time.  The symbols for movements are written in order, from left to right.  The standard (default) distribution of the limb groups is shown.

The set-up of the notation page in EW is very flexible.  It allows the user to divide the body into as many (or as few) parts as necessary to adequately define the movement to be notated.  Movements written in EWMN can be set to music.  However music is not required, since EWMN focuses on the recording of movement alone.

System of reference (SoR) 

EWMN describes movement using a geometrical model that allows the user to observe and notate movement in an objective way, free of verbal ambiguity and emotional attachment.  The notation utilizes a spherical system of coordinates, similar to latitude and longitude on a globe.  Since the movement of a single axis of constant length free to move about one fixed end, will all be enclosed by a sphere, the free end will always describe a curved path on the surface of this sphere.  Every limb in the body can be regarded as such an axis.

Constructing the SoR: One direction on the horizontal plane of the sphere is selected as the starting position for all measurements.  This direction is labeled zero (0).  By measuring off intervals of 45 degrees, eight positions are obtained (Fig. 6).  Four vertical planes intersect the horizontal circle, they are perpendicular to it.

Positions and movement 
The position of a limb is defined by identifying it with the coordinates of the SoR.  Movements of limbs are also defined, oriented and measured in relation to the SoR.

To document transitions between static positions the system takes into consideration the type of movement, amount of movement, spatial orientation and sense (clockwise or anti clockwise), of the movement.

Types of movement 
Three types of movement are defined:  Rotatory movement, when the limb rotates around its axis without changing its place in space. An example of such movement is turning a door knob.  Plane movement, the shortest distance traveled by a limb between any two positions on the SoR.  "Jumping jacks" exercise is an example for Plane movement. Conical  movement, can be seen in the waist when doing the hula hoop.

Applications 
The flexibility and utility of EWMN allows it to be applied in a wide variety of fields.  It has been used to record movements and forms of the hands and fingers in sign language; in the composition of dances, and the recording of folk dances; it has been used in the fields of medicine, the Feldenkrais Method and sports.  The notation has also been used to record the courting behavior of jackals, and other ethological research.  It was used in the field of graphic and kinetic visual art, and a computer system has been written to plot any movement that can be recorded in EWMN.  The notation can easily lend itself to applications in the fields of robotics, animation or motion picture.  The system was successfully used to detect the very first movement patterns which are a precursor to the development of Autism.  The research carried out by Prof. Philip Teitelbaum and Osnat Teitelbaum at the University of Florida was based entirely on the use of EW to study infant movements.  It shows that specific movement patterns appearing in the first few months of life can be a reliable predictor of the later development of Autism and Asperger's Syndrome.

See also 
Dance in Israel
Culture in Israel
Israeli inventions and discoveries

References

Further reading 
Eshkol, N. 1971. The Hand Book. Tel Aviv: The Movement Notation Society.
Eshkol, N. 1980. 50 Lessons By Dr. Moshe Feldenkrais. Tel Aviv: The Movement Notation Society.
Eshkol, N. 1990. Angles and Angels. Tel Aviv: The Movement Notation Society.
Eshkol, N. & Wachmann (sic), A. 1958. Movement Notation. London: Weidenfeld & Nicolson.
Golani, I. 1976. Homeostatic motor processes in mammalian interactions: a choreography of display. In: P.P.G. Bateson & P.H. Klopfer (eds.), Perspectives in Ethology, Volume 2, pp. 69–134. New York: Plenum Press.
Hutchinson Guest, A. 1984. Dance Notation: The Process of Recording Movement on Paper. London: Dance Books.
Hutchinson Guest, A. 1989. Choreo-Graphics: A Comparison of Dance Notation Systems from the Fifteenth Century to the Present. New York: Gordon and Breach.
Eshkol, N.; Wachman, A. Movement notation. London: Weidenfeld & Nicolson; 1958.
Eshkol, N.; Melvin, P., Michl, J., Von Foerster, H., Wachman, A. Notation of
movement. USA: Biological Computer Laboratory. Dept, of Electrical Engineering, University of Illinois; 1970.
Eshkol, N. Movement Notation Survey. Israel: The Movement Notation Society; 1973.
Hoyman, Annelis S. Eshkol-Wachman Movement Notation. USA: Urbana, Illinois; 1984.
Hutchinson-Guest, A. Dance Notation. The process of recording movement on paper. London: Dance Books; 1984, 108–114.
Eshkol, N.; Harries, J. G., EWMN Part I. Israel: The Movement Notation Society; 2001.

Composition in EWMN 
Eshkol, N. Right Angled Curves (Dance suite). Israel: The Movement Notation Society & Tel Aviv University; 1975.
Eshkol, N. Diminishing Series (dance suite). Israel: The Movement, Tel Aviv University; 1978.
Eshkol, N. Rubaiyat (dance suite). Israel: The Movement Notation Society & Tel Aviv
University; 1979.
Eshkol, N. Angles and Angels (dance suite). Israel: The Movement Notation Society & Tel Aviv University; 1990.
Cohen, E.; Hetz, A. Study and Studio. Israel: Jerusalem Rubin Academy of Music and Dance, 1993.
Cohen, E.; Breitbart, O. D'muyot (Wandering Figures). Jerusalem: The Rubin
Academy of Music and Dance; 2001.
Sapir, T.; Reshef-Armony, S. Birds. Holon: The Movement Notation Society; 2005.
Sapir, T.; Al-Dor, N. Moving Landscape. Holon: The Movement Notation Society; 2007.

Classical forms of dance 
Eshkol, N.; Nul, R. Classical ballet., Israel: Israel Music Institute; 1968.
Eshkol, N. Tomlinson's Gavot. Israel: Tel Aviv University; 1985.

Composition and graphic- kinetic art 
Harries, J.G.; Shapes of movement. Israel: The Movement Notation Society; 1969.
Harries, J.G. Language of shape and movement. Israel: The Movement Notation Society
& Tel Aviv University; 1983.
Harries, J.G. Symmetry and Notation. Israel: Tel Aviv University; 1985.

Physical education 
Arad, M.; Sonnenfeld, M., Eshkol, N. Physical training. Israel: Israel Music Institute; 1969.
Sonnenfeld, M.; Shoshani, M., Eshkol, N. Twenty-Five lessons by Dr. Moshe Feldenkrais. Israel: The Movement Notation Society; 1981.
Eshkol, N. Twenty-Five lessons by Dr. Moshe Feldenkrais. (Second edition). Israel: The Movement Notation Society; 1976.
Eshkol, N. et al. 50 lessons by Dr. M. Feldenkrais. Israel: The Movement Notation
Society; 1980.
Eshkol, N. et al. 50 Lessons by Dr. M. Feldenkrais. Second Edition. Israel: The
Movement Notation Society; 1989.

Studies in animal behavior 
Golani, I. The golden jackal. Israel: The Movement Notation Society; 1969.
Notated record of studies in animal behavior carried out by Dr. Ilan Golani at the
Zoology Department, Tel Aviv University.
Zeidel, S. In the steps of the horses. Israel: Institute of Human Ecology; 1990.

Folk dances 
Shoshani, M.; Zeidel, S., Eshkol, N. Dances of Israel. Israel: Israel Music Institute; 1970.
Eshkol, N.; Harries J.G., Zeidel, S., Shoshani, M. The hand book. Israel: The Movement Notation Society; 1972.
Eshkol, N.; Zeidel, S., Sapir, T., Shoshani, M. The Yemenite dance. Israel: The Movement Notation Society; 1971.
Eshkol, N.; Bone, O., Harries, J.G., Kopit, Z., Nul, R., Sella, R., Shoshani, M. Debka.
Israel: The Movement Notation Society & Tel Aviv University; 1974.
Eshkol, N.; Zeidel, S. In the steps of the Hora. Israel: The Movement Notation
Society & Tel Aviv University; 1986.
Zeidel, S. Ethnic dance: variations in six . Israel: The Movement Notation Society;
1987.

Education: teaching EWMN 
Eshkol, N.; Seidel, S., Sapir, T., Nul, R., Harries, J.G., Shoshani, M., Sella, R.
Moving Writing Reading. Israel: The Movement Notation Society & Tel Aviv
University; 1973.

Sapir, T.; Eshkol, N. Hanukka Notebook. Israel: The Movement Notation Society & Tel
Aviv University; 1987.

Jones, D.; Cohen, E., Lin, H., Segev, R., Hermon, S. Dance and movement. Jerusalem:
Ministry of Education and Culture; 1990.

Eshkol, N. A Children's Work. Israel: The Movement Notation Society, 1997.
Cohen, E. Movement and Eshkol-Wachman Movement Notation. Jerusalem: Ministry of
Education and Culture;1999.

Comparative analysis of movement notations 
Eshkol, N.; Shoshani, M., Dagan, M. Movement notations (Part I). Israel: The
Movement Notation Society & Tel Aviv University. 1979.
Eshkol, N.; Shoshani, M. Movement Notation (Part Two). Israel. The Movement
Notation Society & Tel Aviv University, 1982.
A comparative study of Labanotation and Eshkol-Wachman Movement Notation.

Hutchinson-Guest, A. Choreo Graphics. New York: Gordon and Breach; 1989.

Eshkol, N.; Shoshani, M., Harries, J. G. Tavim Leriqud – CMDN. Israel: The
Movement Notation Society & Tel Aviv University; 1991.
Hebrew translation of the English textbook of a Chinese dance notation method.

Sign language 
Cohen, E.; Namir, L., Schlesinger, I. M. Paris: A new dictionary of sign language. The
Mouton, The Hague; 1977.
A dictionary of sign language.

Eshkol, N.; Harries J.G., Zeidel, S., Shoshani, M. The hand book. Israel: The Movement
Notation Society; 1972.

Martial arts 
Eshkol, N.; Harries, J.G., Sella, R., Sapir, T. The quest for T'ai Chi Chuan. Israel: The
Movement Notation Society & Tel Aviv University; 1986.
An EW reader and study of Cheng's short form of this martial art.

Eshkol, N.; Sapir, T., Sella, R., Harries, J.G., Shoshani, M. The quest for T'ai Chi
Chuan. Israel: The Movement Notation Society & Tel Aviv University; 1988.
Second and expanded edition. Includes three styles of the solo exercise of this martial art
form.

Appel, A. Karate. Israel: Minimol Publisher, 1990.

General 
Yanai, Z. Notation for the liberation of movement. Journal of IBM. 34–35; 1974.
A general article about EWMN.

Yanai, Z. Notacion para la liberacion de movimiento. "Ariel" Revista Trimestral des
Artes a Letras de Israel. 31:114–130; 1974.

Harries, J. G. A proposed notation for visual fine art. Leonardo. 8:295–300; 1975.

Yanai, Z. Eine schrift für freie bewegnung ."Ariel" Berichte zur Kunst und Bildung in
Israel. 22:114–130; 1975.

Yanai, Z. Un systeme de notation pour la liberation de mouvement. "Ariel" Revue
trimestrielle des arts et letters en israel. 33:114–130; 1975.

Kleinmann, S. Movement notation systems: An Introduction. Quest monograph
XXIII. Winter Issue, January: 33–56; 1975.

Harries, J.G.; Richmond, G. A language of movement. New Dance. 22:14–17; 1982.
General article about EWMN.
Yanai, Z. Notation for the liberation of movement. Contact Quarterly. 82(7):7–15; 1982.

Drewes, H. Transformationen: Bewegung im Notation und digitaler Verarbeitung. PhD Dissertation. Die Blaue Eule: Essen; 2003.

Composition and graphic-kinetic art 
Harries, J. G. A proposed notation for visual fine art. Leonardo. 8:295–300; 1975.
Exposition of the use of EW notation in visual art composition.

Harries, J. G. A proposed notation for visual fine art. Visual Art Mathematics and
Computers. Malina, F. J., Ed. New York: Pergamon Press. 69–74; 1978.

Harries, J.G. Personal computers and notated visual art. Leonardo. 14(4):299–310;
1981.
Article on the combination of EW and computer technology in the composition and
production of visual art.

Harries, J.G. Symmetry and notation: regularity and symmetry in notated computer
graphics. Computer and Math with Applications (GB), Hargittai, Ed. New York:
Pergamon Press. 12b(1–2): 303–314; 1986.

Harries, J.G. Symmetry in the Movements of T'ai Chi Chuan. Computers, Mathematics
and Applications. 17(406):827–835; 1989.

Harries, J. G. Reflections on Rotations. Symmetry: Culture and Science. 8 (3–4):115-
332; 1997.

Animal behavior 
Golani, I. Homeostatic motor processes in mammalian interaction: A Choreography of
Display. Perspectives in Ethology. 2: 1976.

Ganor, I.; Golani, I. Coordination and integration in the hindleg steps cycle of the rat:
Kinematic Synergies. Brain Research 164; 1980.

Moran, G.; Fentress, J.C., Golani I. A description of the relational patterns of movement
during ritualized fighting in wolves. Animal Behavior. 29:1146–1165; 1981.

Pellis, S. M. A description of social play by the Australian magpie gymnorhina tibicen
based on Eshkol-Wachman notation. Bird Behaviour. 3:61–79; 1981

Pellis, S. M. An analysis of courtship and mating in the Cape Barren goose Cereopsis
novaehollandiae latham based on Eshkol-Wachman movement notation. Bird
Behaviour. 4:30–41; 1982.

Pellis, S. M. Development of head and foot coordination in the Australian Magpie
gymnorhina tibicen, and the function of play. Bird Be haviour. 4: 57–62; 1983.

Pellis, S. M. What is "fixed" in a fixed action pattern? A problem of methodology. Bird
Behaviour. 6: 10–15; 1985.

Whishaw, I. Q.; Kolb, B. The mating movements of male decorticate rats: evidence for
subcortically generated movements by the male but regulation of approaches by the
female. Behavioural Brain Research. 17: 171–191; 1985.

Pellis, S. M.; Officer, R. C. E. An analysis of some predatory behaviour patterns in four
species of carnivorous marsupials (Dasyuridae), with comparative notes on the eutherian
cat Felis catus. Ethology. 75: 177–196;1987.

Pellis, S. M.; Pellis, V. C., Chesire, R. M., Rowland, N. E., Teitelbaum, P. Abnormal
gait sequence in the locomotion released by atropine in catecholamine deficient akinetic
rats. Proc. of the National Academy of Sciences. 84: 8750–8753;1987.

Yaniv, Y.; Golani, I. Superiority and inferiority: A morphological analysis of free and
stimulus bounds behavior in honey badger (Mellivora capensis) interactions. Ethology.
74:89–116 ; 1987.

Eilam, D.; Golani, G. The ontology of exploratory behavior in the house (Rattus Rattus):
The mobility gradient. Developmental Psychobiology. 21(7):679–710; 1988.

Pellis, S. M.; O'Brien, D. P, Pellis, V. C., Teitelbaum, P., Wolgin, D. L., Kennedy, S.
Escalation of feline predation along a gradient from avoidance through "play" to killing.
Behavioral Neuroscience. 102:760–777; 1988.

Faulkes, Z. Sand crab digging: The neuroethology and evolution of a "new" behavior.
B.Sc, University of Lethbridge. 1988.

Pellis, S. M. Fighting: the problem of selecting appropriate behavior patterns.
Blanchard, R. J.; Brain, P. F., Blanchard, D. C., Parmigiani, S., Eds. Ethoexperimental
Approaches to the Study of Behavior. 361–374; 1989.

Teitelbaum, P.; Pellis, S. M., DeVietti, T. L. Disintegration into stereotypy induced by
drugs or brain damage: A micro-descriptive behavioral analysis. Cooper, S.J.; Dourish,
C. T., Eds. Neurobiology of Behavioral Stereotypy. 169–199; 1990.

Whishaw, I. Q.; Pellis, S. M. The structure of skilled forelimb reaching in the rat: A
proximally driven stereotyped movement with a single rotatory component. Behavioral
Brain Research. 41: 49–59;1990.

Whishaw, I. Q.; Pellis, S. M., Gorny, B. P., Pellis, V. C. The impairments in reaching
and the movements of compensation in rats with motor cortex lesions: A videorecording
and movement notation analysis. Behavioural Brain Research. 42: 77–91; 1991.

Golani, I. A Mobility Gradient in the Organization of Vertebrate Movement: The
Perception of Movement Through Symbolic Language. Behavioral and Brain Sciences.
Vol 15(2): 249–308; 1992.

Whishaw, I. Q.; Pellis, S. M., Gorny, B. P. Skilled reaching in rats and humans:
Evidence for parallel development or homology. Behavioural Brain Research. 47: 59-
70; 1992.

34. Whishaw, I. Q.; Dringenberg, H. C., Pellis, S. M. Forelimb use in free feeding by
rats: Motor cortex aids limb and digit positioning. Behavioural Brain Research. 48:
113–125; 192.

Whishaw, I. Q.; Pellis, S. M., Gorny, B. P. Medial frontal cortex lesions impair the
aiming component of rat reaching. Behavioural Brain Research. 50: 93–104;1992.

Whishaw, I. Q.; Pellis, S. M., Pellis, V. C. A behavioral study of the contributions of
cells and fibers of passage in the red nucleus of the rat to postural righting, skilled
movements, and learning. Behavioural Brain Research. 52: 29–44; 1992.

Whishaw, I. Q.; Pellis, S. M., Gorny, B., Kolb, B., Tetzlaff, W. Proximal and distal
impairments in rat forelimb use in reaching following pyramidal tract lesions.
Behavioural Brain Research. 56:59–76; 1993.

Whishaw, I. Q.; Gorny, B., Tran-Nguyen, L. T. L., Castañeda, E., Miklyaeva, E. I., Pellis,
S. M. Doing two things at once: Impairments in movement and posture underlie the
adult skilled reaching deficit of neonatally dopamine-depleted rats. Behavioural Brain
Research. 61: 65–77; 1994.

Field, E. F.; Whishaw, I. Q., Pellis, S. M. An analysis of sex differences in the
movement patterns used during the food wrenching and dodging paradigm. Journal of
Comparative Psychology. 110: 298–306; 1996.

Ivanco, T. L.; Pellis, S. M., Whishaw, I. Q. Skilled movements in prey catching and in
reaching by rats (Rattus norvegicus ) and opossums (Monodelphis domestica ): Relations
to anatomical differences in motor systems. Behavioural Brain Research. 79: 163–182;
1996.

Pellis, S. M. Righting and the modular organization of motor programs. Ossenkopp,
K.P.; Kavaliers, M., Sanberg, P.R., Eds. Measuring Movement and Locomotion: From
Invertebrates to Humans. 115–133; 1996.

Faulkes, Z.; Paul, D. H. Digging in sand crabs (Decapoda, Anomura, Hippoidea):
Interleg coordination. Journal of Experimental Biology. 200: 793–805;1997.

Field, E. F.; Whishaw, I. Q., Pellis, S. M. The organization of sex-typical patterns of
defense during food protection in the rat: The role of the opponent's sex. Aggressive
Behavior. 23: 197–214; 1997.

Field, E. F.; Whishaw, I. Q., Pellis, S. M. A kinematic analysis of sex-typical movement
patterns used during evasive dodging to protect a food item: The role of gonadal
androgens. Behavioral Neuroscience. 111: 808–815; 1997.

Iwaniuk, A. N.; Nelson, J. E., Ivanco, T. L., Pellis, S. M., Whishaw, I Q. Reaching,
grasping and manipulation of food objects by two tree kangaroo species, Dendrolagus
lumholtzi and Dendrolagus matschiei. Australian Journal of Zoology. 46: 235–248;
1998.

Whishaw, I. Q.; Woodward, N. C., Miklyaeva, E., Pellis, S. M. Analysis of limb use by
control rats and unilateral DA-depleted rats in the Montoya staircase test: Movements,
impairments and compensatory strategies. Behavioural Brain Research. 89:167–177; 1998

Whishaw, I. Q.; Sarna, J., Pellis, S. M. Evidence for rodent-common and species-typical
limb and digit use in eating derived from a comparative analysis of ten rodent species.
Behavioural Brain Research. 96:79–91; 1998.

Iwaniuk, A. N.; Whishaw, I. Q. How skilled are the skilled limb movements of the
raccoon (Prycyon lotor). Behavioural Brain Research. 99:35–44; 1999.

Pasztor, T. J.; Smith, L. K., MacDonald, N. L., Michener, G. R., Pellis, S. M. Sexual and
aggressive play fighting of sibling Richardson's ground squirrels. Aggressive Behavior.
27: 323–337; 2001.

Whishaw, I. Q.; Gorny, B., Foroud, A., Kleim, J. A. Long-Evans and Sprague-Dawley
rats have similar skilled reaching success and limb representations in motor cortex but
different movements: some cautionary insights into the selection of rat strains for
neurobiological motor research. Behavioural Brain Research. 145: 221–232; 2003.

Gharbawie, O. A.; Whsiahw, P. A., Whishaw, I. Q. The topography of three-dimensional
exploration: a new quantification of vertical and horizontal exploration, postural support,
and exploratory bouts in the cylinder test. Behavioural Brain Research. 151:125–135;
2004.

Neurological syndromes 
Cohen, E.; Sekeles, C. Integrated treatment of Down's Syndrome children through music
and movement. Proceedings of the Fourth International Conferences of DACI. 2:1988.

Teitelbaum P.; Maurer R.G., Fryman J., Teitelbaum O.B., Vilensky J., Creedon M.P.
Dimensions of disintegration in the stereotyped locomotion characteristic in
Parkinsonism. American Psychological Association. 1994.

Teitelbaum P.; Behrman A., Fryman J., Cauraugh J., Maurer R.G., Teitelbaum O.B.,
Principles for the design of walking robots derived from the study of people with
Parkinson's Disease. Paper submitted to the Conference on Simulation of Animal
Behavior, Brighton, England, August 8–12. 1994.

Teitelbaum, P.; Teitelbaum, O.B., Nye J., Fryman, J., Maurer, R.G. Movement analysis
in infancy may be useful for early diagnosis of Autism. Proc. National Academy of
Science. 95:13982-13987; 1998.

Whishaw, I. Q.; Suchowersky, O., Davis, L., Sarna, J., Metz, G. A., Pellis, S. M. A
qualitative analysis of reaching-to-grasp movements in human Parkinson's disease (PD)
reveals impairments in coordination and rotational movements of pronation and
supination: a comparison to deficits in animal models of PD. Behavioural Brain
Research. 133:165–176; 2002.

Teaching EWMN 
Cohen, E. On teaching Eshkol-Wachman Movement Notation to academic students.
Proceedings of the Second International Congress on Movement Notation, Hong Kong.
1990.

Shoshani, M. An Analysis of the use of Eshkol Wachman Movement Notation for dance
composition. Dance Study Dep. Surrey University, UK. 1994.

External links 
 Eshkol-Wachman Movement Notation – Eshkol-Wachman Movement Notation Center
 Movement and notation – Home of EW Notator software
 Sharon Lockhart | Noa Eshkol Exhibition at The Jewish Museum (New York)

Dance notation
Ethology
Autism